Sophie Jocasta Blackall  is an Australian artist, author, and illustrator of children's books based in Brooklyn, New York.

Early life and education

Blackall was born in Melbourne, Australia in 1970.
In 1992, Blackall earned a Bachelor of Design from University of Technology Sydney.

Career 
Blackall started her career with various jobs such as painting robotic characters for theme parks, and authoring a household hints column. She also exhibited her paintings at galleries in Sydney and Melbourne. While in Australia, she married and had two children.

In 2000 she won a lottery for an immigration visa, and moved her family to Brooklyn, New York, even though she had no certainty of employment. She did various editorial work, and did several animated commercials for the UK market.

She began illustrating children's books in collaboration with writers. Her first illustrated book, Ruby’s Wish by Shirin Yim Bridges, won the Ezra Jack Keats Book Award in 2003. Eventually she began writing children's books on her own, as well as continuing her collaborative work. 

Her first book for adults, Missed Connections: Love, Lost & Found (2011), was based on a blog for anonymous messages posted online by lovelorn strangers. She did a series of paintings for the book, based on some of these messages, and also made a poster for the MTA Arts for Transit program which was displayed in New York City subway cars the following year.

Her 2015 collaboration with Emily Jenkins, A Fine Dessert: Four Centuries, Four Families, One Delicious Treat, was praised by reviewers but became the subject of controversy over its depiction of slavery.

She won the 2016 Caldecott Medal for Finding Winnie: The True Story of the World’s Most Famous Bear and the 2019 Caldecott Medal for Hello Lighthouse. 

, she has illustrated more than 30 books for children, including the Ivy and Bean series. For this 10-volume series, she collaborated with author Annie Barrows via email. They did not meet in person until halfway through their work on the series.

Blackall has also collaborated with authors such as Jacqueline Woodson, John Bemelmans Marciano, Jane Yolen, and Meg Rosoff. Her work also includes animated television commercials and editorial illustrations for newspapers and magazines.

She hides an image of a whale in every book, in honor of the novel Moby Dick, by Herman Melville. Blackall dislikes it when an author refers to an illustrated book as "my book", feeling it diminishes the essential role of the illustrations.

She has seriously injured her hand in a fall while working at a children's camp. Rehabilitative physical therapy has only been partially successful; she may have to give up precision drawing, and change her creative methods. She is working on a converting a farmhouse in upstate New York into a retreat for writers and artists, and is thinking of doing more writing herself.

Blackall was appointed a Member of the Order of Australia (AM) in the 2022 Queen's Birthday Honours.

Awards and prizes

List of works

Illustrator 
 The Witches of Benevento series (by John Bemelmans Marciano)
 Mischief Season (2016)
 The All-Powerful Ring (2016)
 Beware the Clopper! (2016)
 Respect Your Ghosts (2017)
 A Voyage in the Clouds: The (Mostly) True Story of the First International Flight by Balloon in 1785 (by Matthew Olshan, 2016)
 Finding Winnie: The True Story of the World's Most Famous Bear (by Lindsay Mattick, 2015)
 A Fine Dessert: Four Centuries, Four Families, One Delicious Treat (by Emily Jenkins, 2015)
 And Two Boys Booed (by Judith Viorst, 2014)
 The Mighty Lalouche (by Matthew Olshan, 2013)
 The 9 Lives of Alexander Baddenfield (by John Bemelmans Marciano, 2013)
 Ivy and Bean series (by Annie Barrows, 2006–2013)
 Mr. and Mrs. Bunny—Detectives Extraordinaire! (by Polly Horvath, 2012)
 Take Two! A Celebration of Twins (by J. Patrick Lewis and Jane Yolen, 2012)
 The Crows of Pearblossom (by Aldous Huxley, 2011)
 Spinster Goose (by Lisa Wheeler, 2011)
 Edwin Speaks Up (by April Stevens, 2011)
 Pecan Pie Baby (by Jacqueline Woodson, 2010) – winner of Horn Book Honor
 Big Red Lollipop (by Rukhsana Khan, 2010) 
 Wombat Walkabout (by Carol Diggory Shields, 2009)
 Jumpy Jack and Googily (by Meg Rosoff, 2008)
 What's So Bad About Being an Only Child? (by Cari Best, 2007)
 Wild Boars Cook (by Meg Rosoff, 2008)
 Meet Wild Boars! (by Meg Rosoff, 2005) – winner of Founder's Award from the Society of Illustrators
 Red Butterfly: How a Princess Smuggled the Secret of Silk Out of China (by Deborah Noyes, 2007)
 Summer is Summer (by Phillis and David Gershator, 2006)
 Ruby's Wish (by Shirin Yim Bridges, 2002) – winner of Ezra Jack Keats Award for Best New Illustrator

Author and illustrator 
 Things to Look Forward To (2022)
 If You Come to Earth (2020), named Best Children's Book of the Year for 2020 by the New York Times
Hello Lighthouse (2018) Winner of the 2019 Caldecott Medal
 The Baby Tree (2014)
 Are You Awake? (2011)
 Missed Connections: Love, Lost & Found (2011)
 20 Party Tricks to Amuse and Amaze Your Friends (1997)

References

External links 

 Official website

Artists from Brooklyn
Australian children's book illustrators
Members of the Order of Australia
Caldecott Medal winners
Living people
Year of birth missing (living people)